The Metropolitan Collegiate Conference (MCC) was a college athletic conference that existed from 1965 until 1969.  The participating schools were exclusively from New York and New Jersey. The 10 founding members of the conference in 1965 were: Manhattan, Long Island University, New York University, Hofstra, Fairleigh Dickinson, Saint Peter's, Seton Hall, Iona, Wagner and St. Francis.  

For the 1967–68 season NYU left the conference to become an independent, and for the 1968–69 season St. Francis followed. By 1969 the conference was defunct.

Men's basketball champions

References

 
Defunct college sports conferences in the United States
Defunct NCAA Division I conferences
Sports leagues established in 1965
Sports leagues disestablished in 1969
1965 establishments in the United States
1969 disestablishments in the United States